Dave Sifry is an American software entrepreneur and blogosphere icon known for founding Technorati in 2004, formerly a leading blog search engine. He also lectures widely on wireless technology and policy, weblogs, and open source software.

Early years 
Sifry grew up on Long Island, and learned to program on a Commodore PET. While in his teens, he decided that someday he would move to Silicon Valley and start a company. After studying computer science at Johns Hopkins University, he worked for Mitsubishi.

Career 
Sifry cofounded Sputnik, a Wi-Fi gateway company, Linuxcare, and Offbeat Guides.

He has been a founding member of the board of Linux International, and a technical advisor to the National Cybercrime Training Partnership for law enforcement.

Dave worked as a business developer for Mozilla/Mozillamessaging, trying to bring partners to Mozilla Thunderbird.

Personal life 
David is married to Noriko and has two kids, Melody and Noah.

Awards 
 2006 Best Blog Guide – Technorati – Web 2.0 Awards
 2006 Best of Show – Technorati – SXSW Awards
 2006 Best Technical Achievement – Technorati – SXSW Awards

References

External links

Sifry’s Alerts, Dave's personal blog.
Technorati management team official page, reference for much of the above
David Sifry podcast, PodLeaders, 2006-04-05
Ten Questions with David Sifry, Signal Without Noise, 2006-07-09
David Sifry on Technorati and entrepreneurship Video
David Sifry on the state of the Net, Video interview, 2008-02-09
David Sifry in Inc. magazine, January 2006

1968 births
Living people
American bloggers
American computer businesspeople
Linux people
People from Long Island
Johns Hopkins University alumni